The Second Corridor (previously Third Corridor) type of railway carriage was one of the standard mid-20th century designs, and was coded SK (previously TK) by the LNER and BR, and CF by the LMS. The layout of the coach was a number of compartments, all of which were second class (known as third class until 1956), linked by a side corridor.

The British Railways Mark 1 SK was the most numerous carriage design ever built in the United Kingdom. The original number series carried was 24000–26217. From 1983, those carriages in the 25xxx and 26xxx series were renumbered 18xxx and 19xxx.

There were two variants, those built for the Midland, Scottish, and Eastern / North Eastern regions had six seats per compartment, with fold-up arm-rests which folded into the seat-back, while those built for the Southern and Western regions, with their heavy commuter loadings into London, had eight seats in each compartment, and no arm-rests. Seating was of the interior sprung bench type.  Over time, some SKs and BSKs were re-allocated from other regions to the Western, who tended to try to stitch the arm-rests in the up position.

In 1985, a number of Mark 2 First Corridor carriages were declassified to become SKs. They were renumbered from 13xxx to 19xxx, putting them after the end of the Mark 1 range (19452–19560).

No carriages of this type are still in daily use on the main line network, since open saloon carriages are now preferred by operating companies. Many SKs still operate on preserved UK railway lines.

Designations for second corridor carriages are as follows:

Livery
In 1951 the initial livery for Mk1 coaches on British Railways was crimson lake and cream with black and gold lining, and all new Mk1 SK coaches were delivered in this livery up until 1956. In 1956 the standard livery changed to maroon with black and gold lining, except for the Southern region stock which adopted an unlined dark malachite green. Western Region adopted chocolate and cream on sufficient stock to operate its named trains such as the Cornish Riviera Express and the Torbay Express. In 1965 Manastral Blue & Grey livery was introduced as trailed on XP64 stock the year before and was the network standard for over 20 years. In the 1980s the NSE livery of white with blue at window level and red stripe under was introduced for stock in the south east of England.

Orders

Conversions
 In 1973-74 4 Second Corridor were converted to Class 309 TSK later become TSOL 
 In 1976, 9 Second Corridor were converted to Stowage Vans 80431-80439 POT
 In 1977, 15 Second Corridor were converted to Sorting Vans 80381-80395 POS.

Departmental use

Corridor Brake Standard/Second
A second corridor coach with a guard's brake compartment is designated BSK. The Mark 1 BSKs had 4 compartments, built as two variants with or without arm-rests depending on region, as with the SKs.

See also
 Corridor coach

References 

 Keith Parkin Locomotive Hauled Mark 1 Coaching Stock of British Railways The Historical Model Railway Society, 
 British Railways Vehicle Diagram Book 200 for Loco Hauld Coaches http://www.barrowmoremrg.co.uk/BRBDocuments/CS/Book_No_200_EK_web.pdf
 Michael Harris British Rail Mark 2 Coaches - the design that launched InterCity Venture Publications 
 Ashley Butlin British Rail Coaching Fleet Mk2, Mk3 & Mk4 A British Railways Illustrated Modern Times Series, Irwell Press 
 G.M.Kichenside British Railways Coaches 1958 Ian Allan ABC
 P Mallaband & L J Bowles Coaching Stock of British Railways 1976 Railway Correspondence and Travel Society
 P Mallaband & L J Bowles Coaching Stock of British Railways 1978 Railway Correspondence and Travel Society, 
 P Mallaband & L J Bowles Coaching Stock of British Railways 1982 Railway Correspondence and Travel Society
 Departmental Coaching Stock DB97xxxx series 1983 Edition, Lineside Publications
 Peter Fox Departmental Coaching Stock First Edition 1984 Platform 5 Publications, 
 Roger Butcher & Peter Fox Departmental Coaching Stock Second Edition 1985 Platform 5 Publications, 
 Roger Butcher & Peter Fox Departmental Coaching Stock Third Edition 1987 Platform 5 Publications, 
 Roger Butcher, Peter Fox & Peter Hall Departmental Coaching Stock Fourth Edition 1990  Platform 5 Publications, 
 Roger Butcher Departmental Coaching Stock Fifth Edition 1993 SCT Publications, 

British Rail coaching stock